Ira Washington Bird (March 17, 1819 – March 11, 1899) was an American politician.

Bird was born in Oneida County, New York. He moved to Milwaukee, Wisconsin Territory in 1836 and worked as a clerk for Solomon Juneau in his store. He then moved to Madison in Wisconsin Territory in 1838. He served in the Wisconsin Assembly from Madison, Wisconsin, in 1849 and was a Whig. He served as sheriff of Dane County, Wisconsin and as Dane County Register of Deeds. He went to California and then returned to Wisconsin in 1852. Bird moved to Jefferson, Wisconsin in 1854. He served on the Jefferson County, Wisconsin Board of Supervisors and as town clerk. Bird practiced law. He was also a Democrat. Bird served as the first mayor of Jefferson, Wisconsin and as county judge of Jefferson County, Wisconsin. He died in Jefferson, Wisconsin from a long illness. His brother was Augustus A. Bird who also served in the Wisconsin Legislature.

Notes

External links

1819 births
1899 deaths
People from Oneida County, New York
Businesspeople from Milwaukee
People from Jefferson, Wisconsin
Politicians from Madison, Wisconsin
Wisconsin lawyers
Wisconsin state court judges
Wisconsin Whigs
Wisconsin sheriffs
County supervisors in Wisconsin
Mayors of places in Wisconsin
19th-century American businesspeople
19th-century American judges
19th-century American lawyers
Democratic Party members of the Wisconsin State Assembly